Akam is an English surname. Notable people with the surname include:

 Dave Akam (born 1960), English track and road cyclist
 Michael Akam (born 1952), British zoologist
 Simon Akam, British journalist and historian

See also
 

English-language surnames